John David Melcher (September 6, 1924 – April 12, 2018) was an American politician of the Democratic Party who represented Montana as a member of the United States House of Representatives from 1969 to 1977 and as a United States Senator from 1977 until 1989.

Early life
Melcher was born in Sioux City, Iowa; his paternal grandparents were from Germany. He attended the University of Minnesota before joining the military.  He served in the United States Army during World War II, and participated in the D-Day Invasion of Normandy with the 76th Infantry Division in Europe during World War II. He was wounded in action in Germany and awarded the Purple Heart, Combat Infantryman's Badge and the Bronze Star.

Melcher married Ruth Klein in 1945.  They had six children.

He graduated from Iowa State University in 1950. Later he moved to Forsyth, Montana, and established a veterinary clinic.

Political career
Melcher served on the Forsyth City Council. He then served as mayor of Forsyth in 1955, for three terms. In 1960, he was elected to the Montana House of Representatives for Rosebud County.

In 1962, he was elected to the Montana Senate. He was elected to the United States House of Representatives by special election on June 24, 1969, to fill a vacancy created when the incumbent, Republican James F. Battin, resigned to accept an appointment to the Federal bench. Melcher was re-elected to the three succeeding Congresses and served from June 24, 1969, to January 3, 1977.

In 1976, he was elected to the United States Senate to succeed retiring Democratic Senator Mike Mansfield.

Melcher was re-elected in 1982 against Republican Larry R. Williams. Melcher had been targeted by National Conservative Political Action Committee (NCPAC) as potentially vulnerable, and he was subjected to attack ads depicting him as "too liberal for Montana". Melcher's response became a classic of campaign advertising, featuring a shot of an "out-of-stater" carrying a briefcase full of money, followed by a conversation among several cows deploring their intervention in the race.

His campaign for re-election in 1988 was unsuccessful; he was defeated by Republican Conrad Burns.  Melcher attributed the loss to a lack of time spent campaigning. A wilderness management bill he co-sponsored was vetoed by President Ronald Reagan only days before the 1988 election.

Melcher was a candidate in the 1994 Senate election, but lost to Jack Mudd in the primary.

Political positions and legislative contributions
Melcher had generally liberal views on environmental issues, but was pro-life and supported prayer in public schools. He was a co-sponsor of the Surface Mining Control and Reclamation Act of 1977, which regulated coal strip mining.

Melcher was responsible in 1984 for an amendment to the Animal Welfare Act that required psychological well-being to be protected in primate research. This legislation was praised by Jane Goodall, and in 1987 he was the presenter to her of the Schweitzer Medal of the Animal Welfare Institute.

Later life 

After serving in the Senate, Melcher worked as a lobbyist for multiple organizations, including the American Veterinary Medical Association.

Melcher died on April 12, 2018, in Missoula, Montana, at the age of 93.

References

External links
 John Melcher Interviews Oral History Project (University of Montana Archives)

|-

|-

|-

|-

|-

1924 births
2018 deaths
United States Army personnel of World War II
American people of German descent
American veterinarians
Male veterinarians
Iowa State University alumni
Montana city council members
Democratic Party members of the United States House of Representatives from Montana
Democratic Party United States senators from Montana
Mayors of places in Montana
Democratic Party members of the Montana House of Representatives
Military personnel from Iowa
Democratic Party Montana state senators
People from Rosebud County, Montana
Politicians from Sioux City, Iowa
United States Army soldiers
University of Minnesota alumni
Candidates in the 1994 United States elections
Members of Congress who became lobbyists